Before the Hurricane (translit. Qarishkhlis tsin, Burevestnik in Russian) is a 1924 Georgian black-and-white silent film directed by Kote Marjanishvili based on a script by Shalva Dadiani.

Plot
The film is set in 1905 in a textile factory in Tiflis where two friends are working, Lado and Tade. Lado falls in love with Tade's sister, Tasya. Prince Rostam orders his servants to bring her to him. The friends manage to free the girl and after this they become part of the revolutionary underground ...

Cast
 L. Kavsadze as Gijua
 L. Gogoberidze as Tasya
 I. Djordjadze as Maro
 L. Qartvelishvili as Tade
 L. Sokolovi as Revolutionist
 N. Gotsiridze as Old man
 M. Arnazi as Krilova
 Aleqsandre Imedashvili as Petua
 A. Alshibaya as Count Gigo
 Soso Jividze as Saqua
 Ushangi Chkheidze as Niko
 D. Mjavya as Police-officer
 Q. Andronikashvili as Katine
 G. Pronispireli as Kinto
 D. Chkheidze as Priest

See also

 List of Georgian films

External links 
 

1924 films
Soviet black-and-white films
Soviet-era films from Georgia (country)
1924 romantic drama films
Soviet silent feature films
Soviet romantic drama films
Drama films from Georgia (country)
Silent romantic drama films